{{Infobox scientist
| name              = Karen Heather Vousden 
| honorific_suffix  = CBE, FRS, FRSE, FMedSci
|birth_name = 
| native_name       = 
| native_name_lang  = 
| image             = 
| image_size        = 
| alt               = 
| caption           = 
| birth_date        = 
| birth_place       = 
| death_date        = 
| death_place       = 
| resting_place             = 
| resting_place_coordinates = 
| other_names       = 
| residence         = 
| citizenship       = 
| nationality       = 
| fields            = Cancer
| workplaces        = 
| alma_mater        = Queen Mary and Westfield College
| thesis_title      = Use of suppressor gene mutations to study transfer RNA redundancy in Coprinus
| thesis_url        = http://search.proquest.com/docview/301407293
| thesis_year       = 1982
| doctoral_advisor  = 
| academic_advisors = 
| doctoral_students = 
| notable_students  = 
| known_for         = Work on p53 tumour suppressor protein and Mdm2 protein
| influences        = 
| influenced        = 
| awards            = 
| signature         = 
| signature_alt     = 
| website           = 
| footnotes         = 
| spouse            = 
| children          = 
}}
Karen Heather Vousden, CBE, FRS, FRSE, FMedSci (born 19 July 1957) is a British medical researcher. She is known for her work on the tumour suppressor protein, p53, and in particular her discovery of the important regulatory role of Mdm2, an attractive target for anti-cancer agents. From 2003 to 2016, she was the director of the Cancer Research UK Beatson Institute in Glasgow, UK, moving back to London in 2016 to take up the role of Chief Scientist at CRUK and Group Leader at the Francis Crick Institute.

Education
After attending Gravesend Grammar School for Girls, Vousden gained a Bachelor of Science degree in genetics and microbiology (1978) and a PhD from Queen Mary College, University of London on the use of suppressor gene mutations to study transfer RNA redundancy in the fungus Coprinus.

Career
Vousden's early postdoctoral research positions were with Chris Marshall at the Institute of Cancer Research, London, UK (1981–85) and Douglas Lowy at the National Cancer Institute, Bethesda, United States (1985–87).Cancer Research UK: Karen Vousden (accessed 18 October 2007)  

From 1987 to 1995, she led the Human Papillomavirus Group at the Ludwig Institute for Cancer Research, London, UK. In 1995, she joined the National Cancer Institute in Frederick, USA, serving successively as head of the Molecular Carcinogenesis section of the ABL-Basic Research Program (1995–97), director of the Molecular Virology and Carcinogenesis Laboratory (1997–98), interim director of the ABL-Basic Research Program (1998–99) and chief of the Regulation of Cell Growth Laboratory, Division of Basic Sciences (1999–2002).

From 2003 to 2016, she was the director of the Cancer Research UK Beatson Institute in Glasgow, UK, where she oversaw a £15 million expansion. She also led the institute's Tumour Suppression research group. She also served on the Life Sciences jury for the Infosys Prize in 2014.

Since 2016, she has moved back to London to take up the role of CRUK Chief Scientist and Group Leader at the Francis Crick Institute. In 2018, she was elected a foreign associate of the National Academy of Sciences.

Research

Human papillomaviruses
Vousden's early work focused on the molecular biology of human papillomaviruses (HPVs), which are associated with cervical cancer. With Douglas Lowy and others, she pinpointed the specific viral oncoproteins required by HPV-16 to immortalise epithelial cells. She was also part of a group which showed that E6, one of the HPV-16 oncoproteins, binds to the human tumour suppressor protein p53 in vivo, resulting in its degradation.

p53 suppressor protein
Vousden's recent research has centred on p53, a gene which plays a critical role in preventing the development of tumours by inducing cells subject to stress, such as DNA damage, to commit suicide via the apoptosis mechanism. Her work has been important in delineating the mechanism of this process. With Katsunori Nakano, she discovered a key component in the apoptosis pathway triggered by p53, the protein PUMA (P53 Upregulated Modulator of Apoptosis).

To prevent it being activated inappropriately, p53 is strictly controlled in the normal cell. Vousden discovered that a key element in this regulation is the protein Mdm2. With Allan Weissman and others, she showed that Mdm2 is a ubiquitin ligase which targets p53 for degradation by the proteasome, thus ensuring levels of the protein remain low when the cell is not under stress.

Reactivating p53 can inhibit the growth of some tumours, making Mdm2 an attractive target for cancer therapeutics. As Mdm2 targets only a small number of proteins for destruction, an inhibitor might have few side effects. A major focus of Vousden's recent work has been investigating the structure of Mdm2 and seeking molecules that inhibit it; a group of low-molecular-weight compounds (discovered in collaboration with the Department of Chemistry at the University of Glasgow) have recently shown promise in cell-culture studies. Mdm2 inhibitors have also been discovered by researchers at Hoffmann–La Roche and the Karolinska Institute.

p53 can also help to prevent or repair minor damage to the genome under conditions of low stress. Vousden's group have recently discovered a novel p53-regulated protein, TIGAR (T-p53 Inducible Glycolysis and Apoptosis Regulator), which can reduce oxidative stress in cells and might mediate part of this effect of p53.

Key publications

Peters G, Vousden KH, eds. Oncogenes and Tumour Suppressors (Oxford University Press; 1997)

Awards and honours
Vousden is a fellow of the Royal Society (2003), Royal Society of Edinburgh (2004) and the Academy of Medical Sciences (2006); she was also elected a member of the European Molecular Biology Organization in 2004. The Institute of Cancer Research awarded her an Honorary Doctorate in Science (Medicine) in 2006. She gave the Sir Frederick Gowland Hopkins Memorial Lecture of the Biochemical Society in 2008. She was awarded the Royal Medal from the Royal Society of Edinburgh in 2009. Vousden was appointed Commander of the Order of the British Empire (CBE) in the 2010 New Year Honours.

In 2004, The Scotsman'' named Vousden among the 25 most powerful Scottish women.

In 2021, Karen Vousden was recognized with the first Pezcoller Foundation-Marina Larcher Fogazzaro-EACR Women in Cancer Award.

References

1957 births
20th-century British biologists
20th-century American women scientists
21st-century British biologists
21st-century American women scientists
Academics of the Institute of Cancer Research
Alumni of Queen Mary University of London
British women biologists
Commanders of the Order of the British Empire
Fellows of the Academy of Medical Sciences (United Kingdom)
Fellows of the Royal Society
Fellows of the Royal Society of Edinburgh
Female Fellows of the Royal Society
Living people
Members of the European Molecular Biology Organization
Foreign associates of the National Academy of Sciences
People educated at Mayfield Grammar School
Academics of the Francis Crick Institute
American women academics